The Great Regression refers to worsening economic conditions affecting lower earning sections of the population in the United States, Western Europe and other advanced economies starting around 1981. These deteriorating conditions include rising inequality; and falling or stagnating wages, pensions, unemployment insurance, and welfare benefits. The decline in these conditions has been by no means uniform. Specific trends vary depending on the metric being tracked, the country, and which specific demographic is being examined. For most advanced economies, the worsening economic conditions affecting the less well off accelerated sharply after the late-2000s recession.

The Great Regression contrasts with the "Great Prosperity" or Golden Age of Capitalism, where from the late 1940s to mid 1970s, economic growth delivered benefits which were broadly shared across the earnings spectrums, with inequality falling as the poorest sections of society increased their incomes at a faster rate than the richest.

Examples
Some of the trends making up the great regression pre-date 1981. Such as stagnating wages for production and non-supervisory workers in the U.S. private sector; real wages for these workers peaked in 1973. Or the divergence in increases of productivity and pay for such workers: these two factors tended to increase in "lock-step" until about 1973, but then  diverged sharply, with productivity increasing massively over the following decades, while pay stagnated.  The break down of Bowley's law, the apparently near fixed proportion of economic output going to workers, is another enduring change which began around the mid 1970s.

Causes
Robert Reich considers the main cause to be political, with the rich better able to influence politics. The great regression has largely coincided with decreasing bargaining power for workers, which itself partly results from the falling influence of unions. Especially since 2013, the adverse economic trends have been increasingly blamed on technological unemployment, and with recently increased uptake of robots and automation in the emerging economies, there are concerns that workers there too may soon suffer from the great regression. Since 1980, under Reaganomics, there has been a decline of the progressive income tax leading to a rise in inequality.

See also

 2000s commodities boom
 Great Recession
 Great Recession in the United States
 Financial crisis of 2007–08
 Late capitalism
 Savings and loan crisis
 Share repurchase
 Stock market crash
 The Great Stagnation

References

External links
Charts on the New York Times comparing the Great Regression with the "Great Prosperity" of 1947 - 1979.

1990s economic history
2000s economic history
2010s economic history